Carmen Susana Duijm Zubillaga (August 11, 1936 – June 18, 2016) was a Venezuelan actress, television host, model and beauty queen who was crowned Miss Venezuela 1955 and competed at Miss Universe 1955, placing in the top 15. She then went to compete at Miss World 1955 and won, becoming the first Venezuelan and Latin American woman to win the Miss World crown.

Miss Universe
Before competing in Miss World, Duijm was a semi-finalist at Miss Universe 1955.

Miss World
She won the 1955 Miss World pageant, representing Venezuela. The pageant was held in London, United Kingdom.

Life after pageants
Her success as a beauty queen led to a career as an actress and a presenter on Venezuelan television.  Thanks to her, there is one arepa called "Reina Pepiada". She lived in Margarita Island, Venezuela until 2016.

Her daughter, Carolina Cerruti was the official representative of Venezuela to the 1983 Miss World pageant held in London, on November 17, 1983.

References

External links
Susana Duijm en "Bellas Venezolanas"

1936 births
2016 deaths
Miss Universe 1955 contestants
Miss World 1955 delegates
Miss World winners
Miss Venezuela winners
People from Barcelona, Venezuela
Venezuelan female models
Venezuelan telenovela actresses
Venezuelan television personalities
Venezuelan television presenters
Venezuelan women television presenters
Venezuelan beauty pageant winners